Sebastián Decoud was the defending champion, but lost in the second round.
João Souza won the title, defeating Guillaume Rufin 6–2, 7–6(7–4) in the final.

Seeds

Draw

Finals

Top half

Bottom half

References
 Main Draw
 Qualifying Draw

Quito Challenger - Singles
2012 Singles